Bate may refer to:

Places
Baté, a village in Hungary
Bate (Attica), a deme of ancient Attica
Bate, Burkina Faso, a town in Burkina Faso
Bate, Nova Gorica, a village in the Municipality of Nova Gorica, Slovenia
Baté Empire, a pre-colonial state in what is today Guinea
Bate Islands, Nunavut, Canada

Other uses
FC BATE Borisov, a top Belarusian football club
 Bating (leather), a substance, often made from fermented animal dung, used to remove hair and the outer protein layer from hide in tanning leather
Bate (surname), a surname, including notable people with the surname

See also
B8 (disambiguation)
Bates (disambiguation)
Bated breath (disambiguation)